Moyeuvre is the name of two adjacent communes in the Moselle department of France.

Moyeuvre-Grande
Moyeuvre-Petite